The North Berwick Golf Club (NBGC), at North Berwick, East Lothian, was founded in 1832. It is the 13th oldest golf club in the world and only St Andrews hosts a club which has played continuously over the same course for longer. Although the NBGC was the first club in the world to allow female members, full membership rights were only granted to ladies in 2005. The club is based at the North Berwick West Links golf course.

The West Links Course at North Berwick is a true links course located on the edge of the Firth of Forth.  It is a championship course that has hosted many events over the years, including Final Qualifying for The Open Championship and the men's and women's Amateur Championships. Golf has been played over the historic West Links course since the 17th century. The 15th hole on the West Links, known as Redan, has been replicated at many courses around the world, with architects Charles B. Macdonald and Seth Raynor being most associated with the design.

Course Layout

References

Golf clubs and courses in East Lothian
Sports clubs established in 1832
1832 establishments in Scotland
North Berwick